Ashvini Yardi is a producer of Bollywood movies such as OMG – Oh My God!, 72 Miles, Bhaji in Problem, Fugly and Singh Is Bliing.

After having a 20-year-long career in television, Yardi formed Grazing Goat Pictures with actor Akshay Kumar in December 2011. At Zee TV she opted for shows such as Saat Phere, Sailaab, Kasamh Se, Sarrkar, Teen Bahuraaniyaan, Banoo Main Teri Dulhann, Ghar ki Lakshmi Betiyaan, Banegi Apni Baat, among several others. She also conceptualized the singing reality show Sa Re Ga Ma Pa Challenge and Lil' Champs before leaving to join Colors. At Colors, she brought in shows such as Uttaran, Balika Vadhu, Bigg Boss, Khatron Ke Khiladi, Veer Shivaji, Laado and took the new channel zooming to the No 1 spot.

She has earned a BA in Psychology, Advertising and Marketing from XIC, Mumbai.

Filmography

Films

Television

Web series 

 Jamai 2.0 (2019)

References

External links
 

Living people
St. Xavier's College, Mumbai alumni
Film producers from Mumbai
Year of birth missing (living people)
Place of birth missing (living people)
Indian women film producers
21st-century Indian businesswomen
21st-century Indian businesspeople
Businesswomen from Maharashtra